Santa Bárbara de Carhuacayan District or Santa Bárbara de Carhuacayán District is one of ten districts of the Yauli Province in the Junín Region in Peru.

Geography 
The Puwaq Hanka mountain range traverses the district. Other mountains are listed below:

See also 
 Tuqtuqucha
 Waskhaqucha

References